Timothy Jolyon Carter (born 21 September 1969) is a former English cricketer.  Carter was a right-handed batsman who bowled leg break.  He was born in Tiverton, Devon.

Carter represented the Surrey Cricket Board in List A cricket.  His debut List A match came against Norfolk in the 1999 NatWest Trophy.  From 1999 to 2001, he represented the Board in 4 List A matches, the last of which came against Lincolnshire in the second round of the 2002 Cheltenham & Gloucester Trophy which was held in 2001.  In his 4 List A matches, he scored 47 runs at a batting average of 11.75, with a high score of 29.  In the field he took 2 catches.

References

External links
Timothy Carter at Cricinfo
Timothy Carter at CricketArchive

1969 births
Living people
Sportspeople from Tiverton, Devon
Cricketers from Devon
English cricketers
Surrey Cricket Board cricketers